Burlington, Oregon may refer to:

Burlington, Linn County, Oregon, a former community
Burlington, Multnomah County, Oregon, a populated place